Guijo de Ávila is a municipality located in the province of Salamanca, Castile and León, Spain.

References

Municipalities in the Province of Salamanca